Nemophas zonatus is a species of beetle in the family Cerambycidae. It was described by Lansberge in 1880. It is known from Indonesia.

References

zonatus
Beetles described in 1880